Minuscule 289 (in the Gregory-Aland numbering), ε 713 (Soden), is a Greek minuscule manuscript of the New Testament, on paper. It is dated by a colophon to the year 1625. 
It has marginalia.

Description 

The codex contains the text of the four Gospels on 336 paper leaves. The text is written in one column per page, in 19 lines per page.

Text 

The Greek text of the codex is a representative of the Byzantine text-type. Aland placed it in Category V.
It was not examined by the Claremont Profile Method.

History 

The manuscript was written by Lucas, the αρχιθυτης. The manuscript was added to the list of New Testament manuscripts by Scholz (1794-1852). 
It was examined and described by Paulin Martin. C. R. Gregory saw it in 1885.

The manuscript is currently housed at the Bibliothèque nationale de France (Gr. 100A) at Paris.

See also 

 List of New Testament minuscules
 Biblical manuscript
 Textual criticism

References

Further reading 

 Jean-Pierre-Paul Martin, Description technique des manuscrits grecs, relatif au Nouveau Testament, conservé dans les bibliothèques des Paris (Paris 1883), p. 71.

Greek New Testament minuscules
17th-century biblical manuscripts
Bibliothèque nationale de France collections